Fowzia Fathima (born 24 January 1972) is an Indian film cinematographer and director. Fowzia is known for her cinematography on feature films such as Mitr, My Friend 2012, Gulumaal: The Escape 2009 and Uyir 2006. She is an intuitive practitioner of Cinematography across media technologies, a hands-on Academic with an eye trained in history of art practices along with a wide range of experience in Film Production and Teaching in contemporary cinema based in India.

Fowzia Fathima, an alumnus of Film and Television Institute of India, has also worked as professor and head of department of cinematography at SRFTI and has directed short film Infected that screened at Busan International Film Festival. Fowzia also part of  
“ Indian Women Cinematographers Collective" connecting most practicing professionals in the country today, a forum that functions as a peer group to share experiences and lead founded 2017.

Academic

Film and Television Institute of India Diploma in Cinematography, 1996–1998. First Class, "A "Grade.

Maharaja Sayajirao University of Baroda Master of Arts, in art criticism, 1993–1995, with First Rank.

Stella Maris College, Chennai Bachelor of Arts, in art history, drawing & painting, 1989–1992, with First Class.

Madras Flying Club, Chennai, P.P.L. (Private Pilot License) 1990–1992 (obtained flying license as an NCC cadet).

Career

As a cinematographer

Started career as an assistant to P.C. Sreeram, Fowzia made her debut as an independent camera person with the Revathi directed film Mitr, My Friend, along with an all female technical crew.
Fowzia is also the first ever independent woman cinematographer in Malayalam cinema as well as the force behind Indian Women Cinematographers' collective.

Teaching

2018 – Course Director and Mentor for the Documentary film-making Workshop, at IAWRT, International Association of Women in Radio and Television, New Delhi.
2017 – Workshops on Cinema, Film-making and Ways of Seeing with hands-on training in Digital cinematography at Srishti School of Art Design and Technology Bangalore.
2017-Conducting Lighting Practicals Examination, Assessments, setting of Question papers for Cinematography students at KRNNIVSA, Kottayam 
2017 – Workshop for Acting Batch at the State University of Performing and Visual Arts (SUPVA), Rohtak, Haryana
2015–2016 Conducted courses in filmmaking at SJCC, Chenganachery for 2 batches of students of MA in cinema & television.

Recognition
2015 – Won the award for Best Camera person, at the Kerala State Television Awards, 2015 for the film 'Aggedu nayyege' (Mother Tongue) on tribal children's integration into the mainstream schooling in Attapadi hills, Kerala.
2006 – Was listed in the magazine India Today as one of the top ten cinematographers from Chennai making their mark in Indian cinema.
2006 – Awarded for Best Cinematographer for the tamil feature film Uyir by Iyal Isai Nadaga Mandram, Chennai. 
2003 – Awarded Best Cinematographer for the tamil feature film "Ivan" by Iyal Isai Nadaga Mandram, Chennai.               
2006 – Jury Member in the Kerala State Film Awards
2018 – Jury Member at the First Pondichery International Film Festival, September.  
2015 – Jury Member of Indian Panorama selections for the International Film Festival of India, Goa .

Filmography

As director of photography

Direction and cinematography

References

External links
 

Living people
Tamil film cinematographers
Malayalam film cinematographers
Cinematographers from Tamil Nadu
Hindi film cinematographers
Bengali film cinematographers
Film and Television Institute of India alumni
1972 births